Lochmaeocles basalis is a Central American species of beetle in the family Cerambycidae. It was described by Dillon and Dillon in 1946. It is known from Panama and Honduras.

It was first found in the rainforests of Brazil.

References

basalis
Beetles described in 1946